"Gangstas Make the World Go Round" is the second single by Westside Connection from the debut studio album, Bow Down, which was released on February 18, 1997.

Track listing 
CD Single
 Gangstas Make the World Go Round (Album Version) — 4:36
 Gangstas Make the World Go Round  (Clean) — 4:37
 Gangstas Make the World Go Round (Instrumental) — 4:38
 Bow Down (Ice Cube's Gangsta Mix) — 4:32

Charts

Weekly charts

References

1996 songs
Westside Connection songs
Gangsta rap songs
G-funk songs
1997 singles
Songs written by Mack 10
Songs written by WC (rapper)
Songs written by Ice Cube